The Chinanteca salamander (Bolitoglossa chinanteca) is a species of salamander in the family Plethodontidae.
It is endemic to Sierra Juárez, Oaxaca, Mexico. Its sister taxon is Bolitoglossa occidentalis.

Distribution
Bolitoglossa chinanteca is known from three localities in Sierra Mixe and Sierra Juárez, Oaxaca. The species has not been assessed by the International Union for Conservation of Nature, but it could be classified as "Near Threatened", given its small area of occurrence.

Description
They can be found in the axils of banana plants during the day, and on vegetation at night. They are presumably arboreal, like their close relatives.

References

Bolitoglossa
Endemic amphibians of Mexico
Amphibians described in 2012